Deesbach is a municipality in the district Saalfeld-Rudolstadt, in Thuringia, Germany.

People from Deesbach 
 Elmar Faber (1934-2017)

References

Municipalities in Thuringia
Saalfeld-Rudolstadt
Schwarzburg-Rudolstadt